Prometheus Gas S.A. is a Greek – Russian joint company, established in 1991 in Athens. The Russian natural gas export company Gazprom Export, on behalf of Gazprom, holds the 50% of the shares. Mr. Dimitrios Ch. Copelouzos, Chairman & Managing Director of Copelouzos Group, holds the 50% of shares.

Among the basic sectors of the business activity of the Copelouzos Group and of Prometheus Gas are the importation and marketing of Russian natural gas in the Greek Market, the participation in the development of the necessary infrastructure with active involvement in the construction of natural gas transmission pipelines, compressor stations and city natural gas distribution networks. Within the interests of the company also fall the promotion and the implementation of business plans, aiming at creating new major natural gas consumers such as the modern natural gas fired combined cycle power stations.

Prometheus Gas has secured for at least 50 years, through Gazprom, large quantities of gas in excess of those contracted to be imported into Greece by the state utility DEPA. These quantities amount to 3 billion cubic meters (bcm) annually until 2016 and 7 bcm annually beyond this period.

See also

 Energy in Greece

References

Oil and gas companies of Greece
Gazprom subsidiaries
Companies based in Athens
Greek brands